William Stillman Stanley Jr. was a member of the Wisconsin State Assembly and the Wisconsin State Senate.

Biography
Stanley was born on March 28, 1838 in Smithfield, Rhode Island. During the American Civil War, he was an officer in the Union Army with the Army of the James. Stanley moved to Colorado in 1865 before settling in Milwaukee, Wisconsin in 1867. There, he worked as a jeweler.

Political career
Stanley was elected to the Assembly in 1881 and re-elected 1882. That year, he was also elected to the Senate. Previously, he had been a postmaster in Colorado. He was a Republican.

References

People from Smithfield, Rhode Island
Politicians from Milwaukee
Republican Party Wisconsin state senators
Republican Party members of the Wisconsin State Assembly
Colorado postmasters
Colorado Republicans
Union Army officers
People of Wisconsin in the American Civil War
American jewellers
1838 births
Year of death missing